William de Dratton was Archdeacon of Leicester from 1232 to 1234: he was also Chancellor he was a native of East Drayton.

Notes

See also
 Diocese of Lincoln
 Diocese of Peterborough
 Diocese of Leicester
 Archdeacon of Leicester

Archdeacons of Leicester
People from Nottinghamshire
13th-century English people